Philip John Moore (born 30 September 1943) is an English composer and organist.

Early life
Moore was born in London and attended Maidstone Grammar School.

Career
After studying at the Royal College of Music, he was Assistant Music Master and Organist at Eton College. He became Assistant Organist at Canterbury Cathedral in 1968. He was appointed Organist and Master of the Choristers at Guildford Cathedral in 1974. He succeeded Francis Jackson in 1983 as Organist and Master of the Music at York Minster, a post he held until his retirement in 2008.  In 2015 he began a two-year term as President of the Royal College of Organists.

Honours
In 2016, the Archbishop of Canterbury awarded him the Cranmer Award for Worship "for his contribution to the English choral tradition as a composer, arranger and performer".

Compositions

Choral works
Requiem (2017), premiered by BBC Singers with Stephen Farr (organ)
Alternative Canticles( for the Holst Singers).
Three Prayers of Dietrich Bonhoeffer
I will lift up mine eyes (2012, for Matthew Owens and the choir of Wells Cathedral)
God be in my head (2011, for Lee Dunleavy and the choir of All Saints' Church, Northampton)
Magnificat and Nunc Dimittis (Sancti Johannis Cantabrigiense) (for St John's College, Cambridge)
O praise God in his holiness (2007, commissioned by Exultate Singers for the Bristol-based choir's fifth birthday)
Holy is the true light (2006)
A Canticle of Light (2002)
God is our hope and strength (2001 for St Mary Redcliffe Church Choir, Bristol)
From Earth to Heaven (1999, commissioned by the Choir of Leeds Minster (then the Parish Church of Saint Peter's-at-Leeds) for the dedication of the Sally-Scott window)
Lo! God is here! (1997, for John Scott and the choir of St Paul's Cathedral)
Preces and Responses (published 1995, for Guildford Cathedral)
Lo! That is a marvellous change (1991, anthem for men's voices)
O Lord, support us (1991)
In paradisum (1988)
It is a thing most wonderful (1987)
All Wisdom Cometh from the Lord (1983)
God is gone up (1980)

References

English classical organists
British male organists
English composers
Living people
People from Maidstone
1943 births
People educated at Maidstone Grammar School
Musicians from Kent
21st-century organists
21st-century British male musicians
Male classical organists